McClave is an unincorporated town, a census-designated place (CDP), and a post office located in and governed by Bent County, Colorado, United States. The McClave post office has the ZIP code 81057. At the United States Census 2010, the population of the McClave CDP was 328, while the population of the 81057 ZIP Code Tabulation Area was 418 including adjacent areas.

McClave's services include a store, gas station, post office, and a full K-12 school with large athletic field.

History
The McClave post office has been in operation since 1908. The town was named after B. I. McClave, a pioneer settler.

Geography

Climate
The Köppen Climate system classifies the weather as semi-arid, abbreviated as BSk.

Demographics

See also

Outline of Colorado
Index of Colorado-related articles
State of Colorado
Colorado cities and towns
Colorado census designated places
Colorado counties
Bent County, Colorado

References

External links

McClave, Colorado
McClave School District
Bent County website

Census-designated places in Bent County, Colorado
Census-designated places in Colorado